Kisko refers to a former municipality of Finland 

It also refers to: 

 Kisko block, a community development block in Jharkhand, India 
 Kisko, Lohardaga, a village in Jharkhand, India